Rowland Molony (born 1946) is a British poet and novelist.

Life
Molony graduated from St John's Catholic Comprehensive School Gravesend, Kent, in 1962, and joined the RAF. He spent several years in Bulawayo, Zimbabwe, where he married the artist Elizabeth Baxendale, and has two daughters.  He now lives in Beer, Devon.

He is a teacher and lecturer. His love for poetry and the teaching of English Literature led to him writing his first book for children, After the Death of Alice Bennett.

Awards
2001 Bridport First Prize
2010 {Bridport Second Prize}

Work
 
 Frogs and Co

Anthologies
 
  Poems (with John Torrance)  The Hooken Press 2009

Novels
 
 Themba and the Crocodile  Longman Zimbabwe 1984  ISBN 0582 - 58741 - 7
 The Raintree  Longman Zimbabwe 1986  ISBN 0582 - 00370 - 9

Non Fiction
 Notes from a Clifftop Apiary and Fifteen Poems About Bees and Other Creatures. Published by Northern  Bee Books, 2014.
 On Stillness. (Booklet)  The Philosophy behind Meditation.
 Freedom from Self. (Booklet)  A Philosophy for Living.

Interviews
"John Fowles: The Magus", Dorset, the County Magazine, 30 November 1973

References

British poets
1946 births
Living people
British male poets
Royal Air Force airmen